Robert Rummer (born 1927) was a post-war U.S. American real estate developer best known for developing distinctive residential subdivisions of Mid-Century modern style tract housing in Oregon, United States.

Rummer Homes
Bob Rummer built Eichler-esque homes in Portland during the 1960s and 1970s after his wife Phyllis toured Eichler’s Rancho San Miguel subdivision in Walnut Creek California in 1959.  Rummer built nearly a thousand of these mid century modern homes in and around Portland Oregon, and they have had a cult like following for some time.

During a 2011 interview with Oregon Home, Robert Rummer distilled his architectural vision into a phrase: "houses that bring the inside out or the outside in".

Some of the floor plans include atriums, with other features like large floor to ceiling glass windows, post and beam construction (beams originally painted in Rhodda’s Oxford Brown), vaulted ceilings in some models, galley kitchens with Thermadore stainless ovens and cooktops, radiant heat floors, and Roman baths.

See also

 Joseph Eichler
 A. Quincy Jones

References

External links
 Oregon Home Magazine
 Rummer Network

1927 births
Living people
Businesspeople from Portland, Oregon
American real estate businesspeople
Place of birth missing (living people)